Kiehn Berthelsen (born 8 May 1925) is a former international speedway rider from Denmark.

Speedway career 
Berthelsen was a champion of Denmark, winning the Danish Championship on three occasions in 1951, 1953 and 1955. He rode in the top tier of British Speedway in 1952, riding for Norwich Stars.

References 

Living people
1925 births
Danish speedway riders
Norwich Stars riders